Gísela Karina López Rivas (born 1968) is a Bolivian journalist  and politician who served as minister of communication from 2017 to 2019. A member of the Movement for Socialism, she previously served as vice minister of municipal and departmental autonomies from 2013 to 2015.

Biography
Gísela López was born in Santa Cruz de la Sierra in 1968. She began her education in 1974, completing a baccalaureate in her hometown in 1985. In 1986, she entered the Evangelical Bolivian University to study social communication, graduating as a journalist in 1991.

Over ten years, López dedicated herself to print media. In 2004, she received the National Journalism Award for her report Etnias en extinción. The Evangelical Bolivian University also presented her with a career recognition award in 2017.

López ventured into television and radio, carrying out critical and investigative journalism.

Vice Minister of Autonomy (2013–2015)
On 18 June 2013, the Minister of Autonomy, named Gísela López as her vice minister. López held the position until 2 February 2015, when she was replaced by Emilio Rodas.

Minister of Communications of Bolivia (2017–2019)
On 23 January 2017, President Evo Morales appointed López , replacing Marianela Paco.

References

External links
 Official blog

1968 births
Living people
21st-century Bolivian politicians
21st-century Bolivian women politicians
Bolivian journalists
Bolivian women journalists
Communication ministers of Bolivia
Deputy government ministers of Bolivia
Evo Morales administration cabinet members
Evo Morales administration personnel
Movement for Socialism (Bolivia) politicians
People from Santa Cruz de la Sierra
Women government ministers of Bolivia